Hebrew Catholics (in modern Israeli  Ivrím Katolím) are a movement of Jews who have converted to Catholicism and Catholics of non-Jewish origin who choose to keep Mosaic traditions in light of Catholic doctrine. The phrase was coined by Elias Friedman (1987) who was himself a converted Jew. In the Holy Land, they are gathered in the Saint James Vicariate For Hebrew Speaking Catholics in Israel

Beliefs

Besides the other religious segments in Israel from most of the Eastern Orthodox Christian groups of Hebrew Catholics, these Messianic Jews subscribe to the theological doctrines and Catholic dogma of the Roman Catholic faith and are in full communion with the Pope. Many of them are culturally closely affiliated with Eastern Catholicism and Greek Orthodox Christianity. Their main point of differentiation as Hebrew Catholics lies not in the dogmatic beliefs of the Church they belong to being different but in rather their own personal liturgical practices. For example, they may celebrate Hanukkah, and their liturgical calendar might differ from the liturgical calendar used by Latin Catholics in their retention of certain Jewish holidays. Hebrew Catholics as cultural Jews may religiously celebrate Passover, Rosh Hashana, Shavuot, etc. and even wear traditional ritual wear like kippot, tallitot, tefillin, use mezuzot and keep many mitsvot (commandments) in the Torah as a sign of their heritage, like Orthodox Jews do. Where these Jewish holidays and practices do not conflict with Catholic doctrine, they are kept for ethnic reasons, much as Irish Americans might celebrate Saint Patrick's Day as a major feast day regardless of the diocese they reside in, out of a sense of Hibernophilia as Irish Catholics. Saint Paul the Apostle is mentioned in passing in The Acts of the Apostles to have observed the Jewish religious holidays and said it is good as Christians to keep the Mosaic Law as one wishes in the faith (and in ).

History
The main associations of the movement are the Association of Hebrew Catholics (AHC), Remnant Of Israel (ROI) which was founded in 1976 by Father Arthur Klyber, and Miriam Bat Tzion. The AHC and the ROI are English-speaking organizations, and Miriam Bat Tzion is a French-speaking one. There is also a group of Spanish-speaking Hebrew Catholics in Venezuela as well as other places.

According to David Moss, the current president of the AHC, it was estimated to have around 10,000 members in 2000. The countries with the largest membership are the USA and Israel, but members are also found in Canada, France, Italy, Australia, Spain, England, Argentina, Brazil, Mexico, Venezuela, Colombia, Belgium, New Zealand, and Germany.

Hebrew Catholics should not be confused with Protestant Christians of Jewish origin that call themselves Messianic Jews, who are members of a variety of denominations, ranging from Anglican e.g. Christ Church, Jerusalem to independent Jewish Christian ones, many of which are Sabbatarian Protestant, and like some Hebrew Catholics, some of their members also celebrate Jewish holy days and emphasize Jewish elements within Christianity. Hebrew Catholics are in full communion with the Bishop of Rome and are not an independent movement, and they may be either liberal or traditionalist. While some form of corporate ecclesial and ritual identity had been raised by some Hebrew Catholics prior to 2009, Pope Benedict XVI's Apostolic Constitution Anglicanorum Coetibus prompted suggestions that personal ordinariates could also be appropriate for other groups, such as Hebrew Catholics, who desire to preserve their identity within the Catholic Church.

Some halachic points of view

According to Bloomer in 2008, "There is a broad range of Jewish Catholics. From those who observe nothing much of the Jewish ways up to those who observe the same as Orthodox Jews. There are many different opinions but they all try to accept each other, whatever their level of observance." 

Furthermore, David Neuhaus, patriarchal vicar for Hebrew-speaking Catholics in Jerusalem and himself a Jew by birth, declared in 2008 that "Dietary laws are not obligatory for those [Jews] who live in Christ. I would only understand dietary laws being observed by Jewish Hebrew Catholics if they had always practised these laws before becoming Catholic. It certainly does no harm. But adopting the laws as Catholics (or as secular Jews who have become Catholic) does not make much sense as we have the fullness of the promise in Jesus." This is debatable though, as not all Jewish Hebrew Catholics agree with David Neuhaus on secular Jews who become Catholic.

In modern-day Israel
Since most Christians in Israel and the Palestinian territories are of Arab ethnicity, Christian clergy are mostly involved in community work with Israeli Arabs or with residents of the Palestinian territories, but rarely with Israeli Jews except Russian immigrants who have Jewish ancestry but consider themselves Christians. Israeli Arabs who belong to the Christian religion are recognized as such under Israeli law, but Jews who have converted are in most cases still registered as Jewish, because the State is very reluctant to recognize such conversions, even though there is no law against them. Some changes in attitude have taken place, as Israeli society is becoming more accustomed to the presence of a variety of religious denominations.

Another sensitivity is regarding Protestant Christians of Jewish origin who still regard themselves as practicing the same Judaism that other Jews practice– Messianic Jews – considered by both traditional Jews and traditional Christians to be a marginal movement.

A significant aspect in Jewish–Christian and Jewish–Catholic relations in Israel is government policy. Ever since the foundation of the State of Israel in 1948, Judaism has been used in government policy and legislation as a means to give Israeli society a sense of identity. As a result, all matrimonial laws in Israel are religious, because no civil marriages can take place. Education is also segregated to a large degree between various religious denominations.

Animosity towards Catholics of Jewish origin was displayed in 1995, when Cardinal Jean-Marie Lustiger visited Israel and the Chief Rabbi Yisrael Meir Lau publicly accused him of betraying the Jewish people.

Vatican attitudes towards Israeli Catholics of Jewish origin have also shifted. From 1955, unofficial communities began performing the Mass in Hebrew with official Vatican endorsement. However, the Vatican has kept a low-key attitude towards this congregation, in order not to antagonize the Arabic-speaking Catholic community, which may not favor Catholics with pro-Jewish sentiments.

The number of Israeli Catholics of non-Arab origin increased during the 1990s, due primarily to immigration from the former Soviet Union. As a result, the Vatican changed its policies in 2003, for the first time ordaining Jean-Baptiste Gourion as Auxiliary Bishop to overlook the Hebrew Catholic community in Israel. The appointment of David Neuhaus as vicar upon Gourion's death in 2003, however, is not in conformity with the importance that the Holy See ostensibly attributes to the newly emerging community. On the other hand, Neuhaus did participate in the Synod for Middle Eastern clergy as a special invitee of the Pope, and Hebrew – for the first time ever – was one of the official languages in which Radio Vatican covered the event.

From 2017 to 2021, Father Rafic Nahra was the patriarchal vicar for Hebrew-speaking Catholics.

Since August 2021, Piotr Zelazko is the new vicar for Hebrew-speaking Catholics.

References
Friedman, Elias (1987). Jewish Identity. New York: The Miriam Press. (HB), (PB).
Stern, Rafael. (1978) "El credo que ha dado razón a mi vida"  (in Spanish language)
David Paul Drach. (1835) "De L'harmonie Entre L'église Et La Synagogue Ou Perpétuité Et Catholicité De La Religion Chrétienne"(in French language)
Gamboa, Richard "Reviviendo los huesos secos" (no ISBN) (in Spanish language)

Citations

External links
Hebrew Speaking Catholic Vicariate in Israel (Hebrew, English, French and Russian)
The Association of Hebrew Catholics
AHC Hebreos Católicos de Argentina
Asociación de Católicos de Carisma Hebraico y de Tradición Hebrea, Maracay, Venezuela A Spanish Site
Catholics for Israel Catholics for Israel and Catholics in Israel committed in fostering dialog and friendship between Jews and Catholics
Hebrew speaking Catholics in Israel (Hebrew) Portal Notzri Qatholi
Remnant of Israel (Mark Drogin) 
Salvation is From the Jews (Roy Schoeman)
Second Exodus (Marty Barrack)
Yeshua's Light
 Rakhem Adonay - Católicos Hebreos - Hebrew Catholics (Spanish and English)
Hebreus-Católicos A Portuguese blog, with English version.

Catholicism and Judaism
Christian terminology
Converts to Roman Catholicism from Judaism
Jewish Christianity
Cultural appropriation